Spannberg is a town in the district of Gänserndorf in the Austrian state of Lower Austria.

Geography
Spannberg lies in the Weinviertel in Lower Austria. About 20.51 percent of the municipality is forested.

References

Cities and towns in Gänserndorf District